Douglas Stenton (born ca 1953) is a Canadian archaeologist, educator and civil servant.

The son of Kenneth and Margaret Stenton, he was born in Chatham, Ontario. He received a bachelor's degree from the University of Windsor, a MA in anthropology from Trent University in 1980 and a PhD in anthropology from the University of Alberta in 1989. Stenton is an adjunct professor in the Department of Anthropology at the University of Waterloo.

He served as executive director of the Inuit Heritage Trust and was the first archaeologist working for the government of Nunavut before being named Director of Heritage in 2002. He was named to the Order of Canada in 2017 for his "enduring contributions to the preservation of Canada's northern heritage".

Stenton's team has developed facial reconstructions from the skulls of two members of Franklin's expedition in the hopes of identifying them. The team will also pursue DNA analysis. Some DNA samples apparently lacked Y chromosomes, suggesting the possibility of women disguised as men among Franklin's crew. However, a more likely explanation is deterioration of those DNA samples.

References 

Living people
Canadian archaeologists
Canadian civil servants
Members of the Order of Canada
University of Alberta alumni
Trent University alumni
University of Windsor alumni
Academic staff of the University of Waterloo
Year of birth missing (living people)